Ballysadare, locally also Ballisodare, is a town in County Sligo, Ireland. It is about 7 kilometres (4 miles) south of Sligo town. The town developed on an important crossing of the Owenmore River.

History

Toponymy
The Ox Mountains are located west of the town. The town itself is named after the falls on the Owenmore River. Ballysadare is in the barony of Leyny formerly the túath of Luighne Connacht, and the barony of Tirerril,   formerly the túath of    Tír Olloíl. The Owenmore river forms the border between the baronies. Ballysadare also borders two other baronies in Co. Sligo, Carbury  to the North and Tireragh to the West. Ballysadare is in the diocese of Achonry.

Alternative names for the falls are Ess Mac Modairn (Falls of the son of Modairn) and Ess na n-Éan (The Falls of the Bird).

There appear to be three variants of English version of the settlement name still in use, Ballysadare being on the road signs coming to dominate.  The use of Ballisodare remains in evidence on the names of some local sport clubs and even on at least one Sligo County Council document in 2018.  Ballysodare appears to been used for the railway station and there is evidence of its use on a map of 1887 and indexing of parish registers at the National Library of Ireland.

Early history
Ballysadare is a possible location for the town noted as Nagnata on Claudius Ptolemy's 2nd century CE co-ordinate map of the world.<ref>{{cite journal|doi=10.1080/00750770801909375 | volume=41 | title=Ptolemys map of Ireland: a modern decoding | journal=Irish Geography | pages=49–69}}</ref> Ballysadare was anciently a major gathering place for all surrounding districts.

St. Columba visited Ballysadare in 575 AD at which "Before the Saint (Columba) returned to Britain he founded one church in the district of Carbury, and proceeded from thence to a place called Easdara, where all the prelates of the neighbouring regions, and vast numbers of holy men and women had come to meet him ; and, to say nothing of the rest of the multitude, which was almost beyond counting, a great many distinguished saints of the race of Cumne are recorded to have been present." This extract is from Colgans Acta Sanctorum Hiberniae.

The O'Hara were the lords of Lúighne.

Saint Féichín
St Féichín was born in the townland of Billa in the parish of Ballysadare. He is said to have studied under St. Nath Í of Achonry further to the south in the same territory. The word Bile means a sacred tree or grove. The townland is the location of the Leaba St. Féichín or St. Feichins bed. The town developed near a church founded by St. Féichín, some time before he died in 664 AD (O’Rorke 1878, 1-4).This monastic site is in Kilboglashy townland and the remains consist of a stone church known as the Great Temple of St. Féichín (Teampal mór Féichín), with a later Romanesque style carved doorway, two small buildings and a graveyard. The O'Duillenain, were erenachs of Ballysadare.

The Canons Regular of St. Augustine built a new priory a short distance to the west in Abbeytown Townland in the 13th century. 
Ballysadare was mentioned in the Annals of the Four Masters 15 times between 1158 and 1602, in 1188, 1199, 1228, 1230, 1235, 1239, 1249, 1261, 1267, 1285, 1360, 1444, 1595 and 1602. In 1360, the Annals of the Four Masters'' note: A bridge of lime and stone was built by Cathal O’Conor across the river of Eas-dara. In 1588, all monastery lands around Ballysadare were seized by the Dublin Castle government on behalf of the Crown.

Mines
Ballysadare is the site of an ancient silver and lead mine, re-opened and worked in the 19th and 20th century. It is now the site of a quarry.

Recent history

Ballysadare was the location of a Pollexfen Mills, since demolished. There is also a hydro electric power station in the vicinity.

The area experienced rapid development during the 'Celtic Tiger' boom, with the population more than doubling in the 20 years between the 1996 and 2016 census (from 612 to 1,350 people). During this period several new housing estates were developed, several of which subsequently remained empty, creating phantom estates. The town was bypassed by the N4 Sligo-Collooney dual-carriageway, completed in January 1998. The N59 Ballina-Sligo road still winds through the town.

Education
It is home to St. Mary's College,a secondary school which serves the southern and western environs of County Sligo, including the surrounding areas of Collooney and Coolaney. There is also St. John's national school which serves the surrounding area

Transport

Gallery

See also
 List of towns and villages in Ireland

References

Further reading

External links

Towns and villages in County Sligo